Buckeye Flat is a former mining town in El Dorado County, California, located a mile east of Shingle Springs at an elevation of about .

The town was named after its first settlers, who came from the state of Ohio, known as the Buckeye State. At its peak, from 1852 to 1856, Buckeye Flat had several stores and at least two hotels. It was home to the first school in the surrounding district.

References

Former settlements in El Dorado County, California
Former populated places in California